No Mythologies to Follow is the debut studio album by Danish singer and songwriter MØ. It was released on 7 March 2014 by Sony Music by Chess Club Records and RCA Victor. The album received positive reviews from music critics. At Metacritic, which assigns a normalised rating out of 100 to reviews from mainstream publications, the album received an average score of 76, based on 19 reviews, which indicates "generally favorable reviews". No Mythologies to Follow debuted at number 58 on the UK Albums Chart, selling 1,438 copies in its first week.

Background
In an interview with Interview magazine, MØ was quoted saying, "I wrote all of the songs, and I'm attached to all of the songs. They all fit together, and I feel like they're telling a story. If I should name one that I think represents the album very nicely, then it's a song called "Pilgrim". It's very simple and strong in its message. Both production-wise and lyrically, it's very simple and minimalistic, but has some depth to it." The  theme for the album is about being young, inexperienced, and being lost in this crazy society we live in these days. Further on the theme she extended, "When you're young and insecure, there's a lot of pressure to live up to these ideals, and it's impossible. It's hard to find your own way and navigate through. That's the theme of the album: to be young and searching." Her track "Pilgrim" was also featured in the Italian version of the advertisement of Armani's fragrance Acqua di Gioia. She noted that the song is wanting to escape the noise of society and just go somewhere private where you can listen to your own thoughts and figure out what you want to be. The track "Don't Wanna Dance" adheres to a collection of squelching synths and was released as a single in February 2014. GQ stated that the track "Walk This Way" has "grand vocals" and fantastically produced "dynamic", funky guitar riffs. MØ recorded the vocals for the album in her childhood bedroom.

Track listing
All lyrics written by Karen Marie Ørsted; all music composed by Ørsted and Ronni Vindahl; all tracks produced by Vindahl; except where noted.

Personnel
Credits adapted from the liner notes of No Mythologies to Follow.

 Karen Marie "MØ" Ørsted – vocals, artwork design
 Anders Bast – horn 
 Signe Bergmann – artwork design
 Thomas "Diplo" Pentz – production 
 James Dring – production 
 Thomas Edinger – horn 
 August "ELOQ" Fenger – drums ; mixing, production 
 Peter Hammerton – mastering 
 Stuart Hawkes – mastering 
 Jens Høll – additional photography
 Paul Logus – mastering 
 Michael Patterson – mastering ; mixing 
 Anders Schumann – mastering 
 Thomas Skou – additional photography
 Thomas Sønderup – photography
 Ronni Vindahl – executive production, mixing, production

Charts

Weekly charts

Year-end charts

Certifications

Release history

References

2014 debut albums
Albums produced by Diplo
MØ albums
RCA Victor albums
European Border Breakers Award-winning albums